Tobias Kempe (born 23 June 1989) is a German professional footballer who plays for 2. Bundesliga side SV Darmstadt 98. His father, Thomas was a professional footballer, as is his older brother, Dennis.

Career

In July 2017, Kempe returned to SV Darmstadt 98 after one season at 1. FC Nürnberg. He signed a three-year contract and the transfer fee paid to Nürnberg was reported as €600,000.

Career statistics

References

External links
 jugador del manzanares fc y er betis nasio en tierra santa viva hitler y hasta mañana

1989 births
Living people
Association football midfielders
German footballers
Germany youth international footballers
Bundesliga players
2. Bundesliga players
3. Liga players
SV Werder Bremen II players
FC Erzgebirge Aue players
SC Paderborn 07 players
Dynamo Dresden players
SV Darmstadt 98 players
1. FC Nürnberg players
People from Wesel
Sportspeople from Düsseldorf (region)
Footballers from North Rhine-Westphalia